Colonel Charles Godfrey (1646 – 23 February 1714) was an English Army officer, courtier and Whig politician who sat in the English and British House of Commons for 22 years between 1689 and 1713.

Early life
Godfrey came from a recusant family, originating in Norfolk, and was the son of Francis Godfrey of Little Chelsea, Middlesex and his wife Anne née Blount.  He was born on 6 November 1646 in Westminster, and was baptised on 26 November at Mapledurham, Oxfordshire. He joined the cavalry and was a captain in the  Grenadier Guards in 1674. In 1678, he was  lieutenant-colonel of  Sir Thomas Slingsby's regiment  and then  captain-lieutenant of horse in the  Duke of Monmouth's regiment. He became a major  of horse in Lord Gerard's regiment in 1679. 

Godfrey married Arabella Churchill, former mistress of King James II, on 1 June 1680 at Holy Trinity Minories, London. He was thus brother-in-law of John Churchill, 1st Duke of Marlborough and on course for preferment in the Royal Household. He also became a close friend and political protégé of Thomas Wharton. He was one of the first to join the Prince of Orange at the Revolution and was rewarded with his own regiment, as Colonel of Godfrey's Regiment of Cuirassiers in 1688.

Career
Godfrey was returned as Member of Parliament for Malmesbury at the 1689 general election. In 1690 he stood unsuccessfully for Parliament at Westminster. He was returned at a by-election on 26 October 1691 as MP  for Wycombe (also known as Chipping Wycombe) by his friend Thomas Wharton. He was returned again in 1695 and 1698. He was appointed Master of the Jewel Office in 1698.  

In 1704, he was appointed   a Clerk of the Green Cloth   a position in the British Royal Household and held the post for the rest of his life. The clerk acted as secretary of the Board of Green Cloth, and was therefore responsible for organising royal journeys and assisting in the administration of the Royal Household. 

He was returned as MP for Wycombe at the 1705 English general election. At the 1708 British general election, he was again returned as Whig MP for Wycombe, voting accordingly  for naturalizing the Palatines in 1709 and for the impeachment of Dr Sacheverell in 1710. He was returned unopposed again at the 1710 British general election and voted for the ‘No Peace Without Spain’ motion on 7 December 1711, but against his party for the French commerce bill on 18 June 1713. Wharton refused to support him at the 1713 British general election and he was unable to find a seat elsewhere.

Godfrey lived in Great Windmill Street near Piccadilly Circus, London.

Death and legacy
Godfrey died on 23 February 1714 while on a visit to Bath, Somerset and was buried in Bath Abbey. He and his wife had a son and two daughters. His son Francis predeceased him in 1712. His daughter Elizabeth  married Edmund Dunch MP (1677–1719) and Charlotte  married Hugh Boscawen, 1st Viscount Falmouth (1675–1734).

References

1648 births
1714 deaths
People from Westminster
4th Royal Irish Dragoon Guards officers
English MPs 1689–1690
English MPs 1690–1695
English MPs 1695–1698
English MPs 1698–1700
English MPs 1701
English MPs 1701–1702
English MPs 1702–1705
English MPs 1705–1707
British MPs 1707–1708
British MPs 1708–1710
British MPs 1710–1713
Members of the Parliament of Great Britain for English constituencies
17th-century soldiers
Masters of the Jewel Office